The position of Resident-Superior of Tonkin (French: Résident supérieur du Tonkin; Vietnamese: Thống sứ Bắc Kỳ; Hán tự: 統使北圻) was established on 8 April 1886 as a successor to the Resident-General of Annam and Tonkin (résident général de l'Annam et du Tonkin) when it was decided to have one French resident for the French protectorate of Tonkin and a separate one for Annam.

List  

List of administrators of the French protectorate of Tonkin

(Dates in italics indicate de facto continuation of office)

See also  

 History of Vietnam
 Tonkin Campaign
 Pacification of Tonkin
 Tonkin Expeditionary Corps
 French colonial empire
 French Indochina

References

External links
World Statesmen – Tonkin (Vietnam)

Vietnam history-related lists
Tonkin
France–Vietnam relations